Lensky District is the name of several administrative and municipal districts in Russia:
Lensky District, Arkhangelsk Oblast, an administrative and municipal district of Arkhangelsk Oblast
Lensky District, Sakha Republic, an administrative and municipal district of the Sakha Republic

See also
Lensky (disambiguation)

References